Glenea nigrorubricollis is a species of beetle in the family Cerambycidae. It was described by Lin and Yang in 2009. It is known from China.

References

nigrorubricollis
Beetles described in 2009